Pine Township is one of twelve townships in Porter County, Indiana. As of the 2010 census, its population was 2,709.

History
Pine Township was organized in 1853, and named for the abundance of pine trees within its borders.

The Weller House was listed on the National Register of Historic Places in 1982.

Cities and towns
Pine Township includes the communities of Beverly Shores and Town of Pines.

Education
The township is mostly served by the Michigan City Area Schools. Its high school is Michigan City High School located in Michigan City, LaPorte County, Indiana. The rest of the township is served by the Duneland School Corporation.

Parks
Pine Township includes the eastern portion of Indiana Dunes National Park, including beaches in the town of Beverly Shores.

References

External links
 Indiana Township Association
 United Township Association of Indiana

Townships in Porter County, Indiana
Townships in Indiana